is a private university in the city of Chiba, Chiba Prefecture Japan, established in 2008. The operator of the university also operates a junior college called Uekusa Gakuen Junior College.

External links
 Official website 

Educational institutions established in 2008
Private universities and colleges in Japan
Universities and colleges in Chiba Prefecture
2008 establishments in Japan